Common names: Russell's boa, rough-scaled sand boa, rough-tailed sand boa.

Eryx conicus, also known as Russell's boa, the  rough-scaled sand boa or the rough-tailed sand boa, is a species of non-venomous snake in the subfamily Erycinae of the family Boidae. The species is native to Southern Asia. No subspecies are recognised.

Description
 

The anterior maxillary and mandibular teeth are longer than the posterior. The head is covered with small scales. The eye is small with a vertical pupil. The dorsal scales are small and keeled. The tail is pointed, not or but very slightly prehensile.

The rostral scale is twice as broad as long, slightly prominent, without an angular horizontal edge. The top of the head is covered with small obtusely keeled scales, except for the nasals and internasals which are enlarged. Interorbitals: 8 to 10. Circumorbitals: 10 to 15. The eye is separated from the labials by one or two rows of scales. Supralabial scales: 12 to 14. Dorsal scales tubercularly keeled, in 40 to 49 rows. Ventral scales: 162-186. The anal scale is single. Subcaudals: 17-24.

The anterior dorsal scales are only feebly keeled, but these keels increase in size posteriorly to the point that they become so heavily keeled that it can make a squirming specimen really painful to handle. This also makes it look as if the front and rear ends belong to markedly different animals.

Dorsally, the color pattern consists of a broad zigzag band or a series of dark brown blotches on a yellowish or brownish grey ground color. The belly is uniform white.

In India it can be mistaken at first glance for either the Indian python (Python molurus) or the deadly Russell's viper (Daboia russelii).

Behavior
E. conicus is active at dusk and at night.

Diet
E. conicus preys upon birds and small mammals, which it kills by constricting.

Geographic range
E. conicus is found in India south of about 30°N latitude, Nepal, Bangladesh and in the northern arid region of Sri Lanka. The type locality given is "India orientali ".

Habitat
The preferred habitat of E. conicus is sandy tracts of central and southern India, the Punjab, Kachchh, and Sind.

Mimicry
The rough-scaled sand boa's color pattern frequently resembles that of the highly venomous Russell's viper, which some herpetologists believe is a case of Batesian mimicry.

Reproduction
E. conicus is viviparous.

References

Further reading

Boulenger GA (1890). The Fauna of British India, Including Ceylon and Burma. Reptilia and Batrachia. London: Secretary of State for India in Council. (Taylor and Francis, printers). xviii + 541 pp. (Gongylophis conicus, p. 247, Figure 75).
Das I (2002). A Photographic Guide to Snakes and other Reptiles of India. Sanibel Island, Florida: Ralph Curtis Books. 144 pp. . (Eryx conicus, p. 13).
Gray JE (1849). Catalogue of the Specimens of Snakes in the Collection of the British Museum. London: Trustees of the British Museum. (Edward Newman, printer). xv + 125 pp. (Gongylophis conica [sic], p. 108).
Günther ACLG (1864). The Reptiles of British India. London: The Ray Society. (Taylor and Francis, printers). xxvii + 452 pp. + Plates I-XXVI. (Gongylophis conicus, p. 333).
Jones C (2004). "Sandboas". Reptilia 9 (3): 20-30.
Schneider JG (1801). Historiae Amphibiorum naturalis et literariae Fasciculus Secundus continens Crocodilos, Scincos, Chamaesauras, Boas, Pseudoboas, Elapes, Angues, Amphisbaenas et Caecilias. Jena: F. Frommann. vi + 374 pp. + Plates I-II. (Boa conica, new species, p. 268). (in Latin).
Smith MA (1943). The Fauna of British India, Ceylon and Burma, Including the Whole of the Indo-Chinese Sub-region. Reptilia and Amphibia. Vol. III.—Serpentes. London: Secretary of State for India. (Taylor and Francis, printers). xii + 583 pp. (Eryx conicus, pp. 112–113).
Tokar AA (1995). "Taxonomic revision of the genus Gongylophis Wagler 1830: G. conicus (Schneider 1801) and G. muelleri Boulenger 1892 (Serpentes Boidae)". Tropical Zoology 8 (2): 347-360.
Whitaker R, Captain A (2004). Snakes of India: The Field Guide. Chennai: Draco Books. 495 pp. .

External links

conicus
Reptiles of South Asia
Reptiles of India
Taxa named by Johann Gottlob Theaenus Schneider
Reptiles described in 1801